Waraphat Phatsathit (also spelt Warapat Petchsatit; born 8 February 1995), nicknamed Ice, is a Thai actor and model. He is best known for his roles in the films Hor taew tak 4 (2012) and Jolly Rangers (2010).

Biography
Waraphat was born on 8 February 1995 in Thailand. He graduated from Ramkhamhaeng University and Dhurakij Pundit University. He made his acting debut with a main role in Thai comedy horror film Oh My Ghosts! (Taew Tak 2) in 2019. The same year he then starred in the film Sassy Player.

In 2010, he starred in the film Jolly Rangers (กองพันครึกครื้น ท.ทหารคึกคัก) where he played 
the leading role with Chermawee Suwanpanuchoke. In 2011, he played supporting roles in the film Luer Lae, is about Thai folk music, released on 15 September 2011. In 2012, he gain increased attention and popularity in the comedy horror film Hor Taew Tak 4.

Filmography

Film

Television series

References

External links 

1995 births
Living people
Waraphat Phatsathit
Waraphat Phatsathit
Waraphat Phatsathit
Waraphat Phatsathit
Waraphat Phatsathit